Drycothaea maculata is a species of beetle in the family Cerambycidae. It was described by Martins and Galileo in 2003. It is known from Bolivia.

References

Calliini
Beetles described in 2003